Skoog is a surname. Notable people with the surname include:

Arne Skoog (1913–1999), Swedish journalist and broadcaster
Christer Skoog (born 1945), Swedish politician
Ed Skoog (born 1971), American poet
Ewa Skoog Haslum (born 1968), Swedish Navy officer
Folke K. Skoog (1908–2001), Swedish plant physiologist
Helge Skoog (born 1938), Swedish actor, TV series Teatersport
Henrik Skoog (born 1979), Swedish middle-distance runner
Myer Skoog (1926–2019), American basketball player
Niklas Skoog (born 1974), Swedish football player

See also
Skoog, electronic musical instrument
Murashige and Skoog medium or (MSO or MS0 (MS-zero)), a plant growth medium for cultivation of plant cell culture

Swedish-language surnames